The 1987 European Parliament election in Portugal took place on 19 July 1987. It was the election of all 24 MEPs representing the Portugal constituency for the remainder of the 1984–1989 term of the European Parliament. Portugal had acceded to the European Community on 1 January 1986 and had been represented in the European Parliament by 24 appointed delegates until elections could be held. These elections took place on the same day of the legislative elections of 1987.

The Social Democrats (PSD) won the 1st European election by a landslide over the Socialists. The PSD won more than 37% of the votes, 15 points ahead of the PS. Note that a large chunk of the PSD vote in the 1987 legislative elections, held simultaneously with the European election, was from CDS voters that voted PSD in the general election and CDS in the EU elections. Nonetheless, the CDS won 15% of the votes, compared with the 4% in the general election ballot. Together, the center-right parties won 53% of the votes.

The Socialists, headed by former PM Maria de Lourdes Pintasilgo, suffered a huge defeat, polling just 22%, matching their general election score. The Communist/Green alliance, Democratic Unity Coalition, polled 4th place and won 11.5% of the votes. Finally, the Democratic Renewal Party (PRD), also suffered a very heavy defeat, winning just 4% of the votes and electing a sole member for the EU Parliament.

Turnout in these elections was quite high, with 72.4% of voters casting a ballot.

Electoral System
The voting method used, for the election of European members of parliament, is by proportional representation using the d'Hondt method, which is known to benefit leading parties. In the 1987 EU election, Portugal had 24 seats to be filled. Deputies are elected in a single constituency, corresponding to the entire national territory.

Parties and candidates
The major parties that partook in the election, and their EP list leaders, were:

Democratic Unity Coalition (CDU), Ângelo Veloso
Socialist Party (PS), Maria de Lourdes Pintasilgo
Democratic Renewal Party (PRD), José Medeiros Ferreira
Social Democratic Party (PSD), Pedro Santana Lopes
Democratic and Social Centre (CDS), Francisco Lucas Pires

National summary of votes and seats

|-
! style="background-color:#E9E9E9;text-align:left;" colspan=2 |National party
! style="background-color:#E9E9E9;text-align:left;" |Europeanparty
! style="background-color:#E9E9E9;text-align:left;" |Main candidate
! style="background-color:#E9E9E9;text-align:right;" |Votes
! style="background-color:#E9E9E9;text-align:right;" |%
! style="background-color:#E9E9E9;text-align:right;" |Seats
|- style="text-align:right;"
| style="background-color: " width=5px|
| style="text-align:left;" | Social Democratic Party (PSD)
| style="text-align:left;" | LDR
| style="text-align:left;" | Pedro Santana Lopes
| 2,111,828	
| 37.45	
! 10
|- style="text-align:right;"
| style="background-color: " width=5px|
| style="text-align:left;" | Socialist Party (PS)
| style="text-align:left;" | PES
| style="text-align:left;" | Maria de Lourdes Pintasilgo
| 1,267,672
| 22.48	
! 6
|- style="text-align:right;"
| style="background-color: " width=5px|
| style="text-align:left;" | Democratic and Social Centre (CDS)
| style="text-align:left;" | EPP
| style="text-align:left;" | Francisco Lucas Pires
| 868,718	 	
| 15.40
! 4
|- style="text-align:right;"
| style="background-color: " width=5px|
| style="text-align:left;vertical-align:top;" | Democratic Unitarian Coalition (CDU) • Communist Party (PCP)• Ecologist Party (PEV)
| style="text-align:left;vertical-align:top;" | COM
| style="text-align:left;vertical-align:top;" | Ângelo Veloso
| style="vertical-align:top;" | 648,700
| style="vertical-align:top;" | 11.50
! 330
|- style="text-align:right;"
| style="background-color: green" width=5px|
| style="text-align:left;" | Democratic Renewal Party (PRD)
| style="text-align:left;" | EDA
| style="text-align:left;" | José Medeiros Ferreira
| 250,158	 	
| 4.44
! 1
|- style="text-align:right;"
| style="background-color: " width=5px|
| style="text-align:left;" | People's Monarchist Party (PPM)
| style="text-align:left;" | None
| style="text-align:left;" | Miguel Esteves Cardoso
| 155,990	 	
| 2.77
! 0
|- style="text-align:right;"
| style="background-color:#E2062C" width=5px|
| style="text-align:left;" | People's Democratic Union (UDP)
| style="text-align:left;" | None
| style="text-align:left;" | 
| 52,835
| 0.94
! 0
|- align="right"
| style="background-color:yellow" width=5px|
| style="text-align:left;" | Christian Democratic Party (PDC)
| style="text-align:left;" | None
| style="text-align:left;" |
| 40,812
| 0.72
! 0
|- align="right"
| style="background-color:red" width=5px|
| style="text-align:left;" | Revolutionary Socialist Party (PSR)
| style="text-align:left;" | None
| style="text-align:left;" |
| 29,009
| 0.51
! 0
|- align="right"
| style="background-color:darkred" width=5px|
| style="text-align:left;" | Portuguese Democratic Movement (MDP/CDE)
| style="text-align:left;" | None
| style="text-align:left;" |
| 27,678 
| 0.49
! 0
|- align="right"
| style="background-color:red" width=5px|
| style="text-align:left;" | Communist Party (Reconstructed) (PC(R))
| style="text-align:left;" | None
| style="text-align:left;" |
| 24,060 
| 0.43
! 0
|- align="right"
| style="background-color: " width=5px|
| style="text-align:left;" | Workers' Communist Party (PCTP/MRPP)
| style="text-align:left;" | None
| style="text-align:left;" | 
| 19,475
| 0.35
! 0
|- align="right"
|- style="background-color:#E9E9E9"
| style="text-align:right;" colspan="4" | Valid votes
| 5,496,935 	
| 97.45
| rowspan="2" | 
|- style="background-color:#E9E9E9"
| style="text-align:right;" colspan="4" | Blank and invalid votes
| 142,715
| 2.53
|- style="background-color:#E9E9E9"
| style="text-align:right;" colspan="4" | Totals
| 5,639,650
| 100.00
! style="background-color:#E9E9E9"|24
|- style="background-color:#E9E9E9"
| colspan="4" | Electorate (eligible voters) and voter turnout
| 7,787,603
| 72.42 
| colspan="2"| 
|-
| style="text-align:left;" colspan="11" | Source: Comissão Nacional de Eleições
|}

Distribution by European group

Maps

References

External links 
 Results according to the Portuguese Electoral Commission of the 19 July 1987 election of the 24 delegates from Portugal to the European Parliament

See also

Politics of Portugal
List of political parties in Portugal
Elections in Portugal
European Parliament

Portugal
European Parliament elections in Portugal
1987 elections in Portugal
July 1987 events in Europe